Waljit Dhillo is an endocrinologist and a Professor of Endocrinology & Metabolism at the Imperial College London. He is the Director of Research at the Division of Medicine & Integrated Care at Imperial College Healthcare NHS Trust and the Dean of the National Institute for Health and Care Research (NIHR) Academy. His research focuses on how the endocrine system controls body weight and reproductive functions.

Early life and education 
Dhillo studied at the St Bartholomew's Hospital Medical College, University of London. He received a BSc in biochemistry in 1994 and an MBBS in Clinical Pharmacology & Therapeutics in 1994. He acquired a PhD in neuroendocrinology at the Imperial College in 2002.

Career and research 
He is a Fellow of the Higher Education Academy (FHEA), the Royal College of Physicians (FRCP), and the Royal College of Pathologists (FRCPath). He was awarded an NIHR Research Professorship in 2015 and appointed Senior Investigator in 2021.

Dhillo's research focuses on how gut hormones regulate the feeling of hunger and the consequent amount of food intake. His research investigates the possible use of gut hormones as medicine that, when administered, would suppress appetite with less side effects than other drugs. More recently he researched the use of kisspeptin treatment for infertile women undergoing in vitro fertilization, and the role of neurokinin B in the hot flush symptoms of menopausal women.

References

External links 

 Article in the New Scientist about Dhillo's research on infertility

British endocrinologists
NIHR Research Professors
NIHR Senior Investigators
Fellows of the Higher Education Academy
Fellows of the Royal College of Physicians
Fellows of the Royal College of Pathologists
British medical researchers
Year of birth missing (living people)
Living people
Place of birth missing (living people)
Alumni of the University of London